Scawby railway station, also known as Scawby and Hibaldstow railway station, was a station in Scawby, Lincolnshire. It was located on the line between Gainsborough and Grimsby. The station  opened in 1849 and closed in 1968 but the line still remains open but calling at fewer stations than it once did.

References

Disused railway stations in the Borough of North Lincolnshire
Former Great Central Railway stations
Railway stations in Great Britain opened in 1849
Railway stations in Great Britain closed in 1968